The title of Earl of Cambridge was created several times in the Peerage of England, and since 1362 the title has been closely associated with the Royal family  (see also Duke of Cambridge, Marquess of Cambridge).

The first Earl of the fourth creation, the Marquess of Hamilton, was at the time sixth in line to the Crown of Scotland (after the Duke of Rothesay, later King Charles I, his sister Elizabeth and her children); his grandfather Lord Arran had been heir-presumptive to, and Regent for, Mary, Queen of Scots.

The Duke of Hamilton currently holds the title Earl of Arran and Cambridge in the Peerage of Scotland, which is not related to this earldom. From 1664, the title Duke of Cambridge superseded that of the Earl of Cambridge.

Earls of Cambridge, 1st Creation (1340)
William of Juliers, 1st Earl of Cambridge (1299–1361)

Earls of Cambridge, 2nd Creation (1362)
Edmund of Langley, 1st Duke of York (1341–1402)
Edward of Norwich, 2nd Duke of York (–1415), resigned 1414

Earls of Cambridge, 3rd Creation (1414)
Richard of Conisburgh, 1st Earl of Cambridge (1385–1415)
Richard Plantagenet, 3rd Duke of York (1411–1460)
Edward Plantagenet, 4th Duke of York (1442–1483), merged in crown 1461

Earls of Cambridge, 4th Creation (1619)
The subsidiary title was Baron of Innerdale (1619).
James Hamilton, 2nd Marquess of Hamilton (1589–1625)
James Hamilton, 1st Duke of Hamilton (1606–1649)
William Hamilton, 2nd Duke of Hamilton (1616–1651) extinct

Earls of Cambridge, 5th Creation (1659)
Henry Stuart, Duke of Gloucester (1640–1660) extinct

Earls of Cambridge, 6th Creation (1664)
James Stuart, Duke of Cambridge (1663–1667)

Earls of Cambridge, 7th Creation (1667)
Edgar Stuart, Duke of Cambridge (1667–1671)

See also
 Duke of Cambridge
 Peerages in the United Kingdom

References

Extinct earldoms in the Peerage of England
British and Irish peerages which merged in the Crown
Noble titles created in 1340
Noble titles created in 1362
Noble titles created in 1414
Noble titles created in 1619
Noble titles created in 1659
Noble titles created in 1664
Noble titles created in 1667